Hennah is a surname. Notable people with the surname include:

Dan Hennah, New Zealand production designer
Walter Hennah (1880–1946), Australian cricketer
William Hennah (1768–1832), British naval officer

See also
Hannah (name)
Henna (name)